The 2020 Pirelli GT4 America Series is the second season of the GT4 America Series. The series is split into a Sprint series, which features 50-minute races with one driver per car, and a SprintX series, which features one-hour races with two drivers per car and a mandatory driver change during Pit stops. The season begins on 7 March at Circuit of the Americas and ends on 3 October at Indianapolis Motor Speedway.

Calendar
The final calendar was announced on 12 November 2019
Due to the COVID-19 pandemic, the SprintX and Sprint rounds at St. Petersburg and Long Beach were cancelled and replaced with tripleheaders at Virginia International Raceway and Sonoma Raceway.

Entry list

SprintX

Sprint

Note: A car marked with STP is entered only for the St. Petersburg makeup races at VIR.

Race results
Bold indicates overall winner

SprintX

Sprint

Notes

Championship standings
Scoring system
Championship points are awarded for the first ten positions in each race. Entries are required to complete 75% of the winning car's race distance in order to be classified and earn points. Individual drivers are required to participate for a minimum of 25 minutes in order to earn championship points in any SprintX race.

Driver's championships

SprintX

Sprint

Team's championships

SprintX

Sprint

See also
2020 GT World Challenge America

References

External links

GT4 America Series